eIF-2 is a kinase enzyme that phosphorylates eIF-2.

There are four forms in mammals:

 EIF2AK1: heme-regulated inhibitor kinase (HRI)
 EIF2AK2: the double-stranded RNA-dependent kinase (PKR)
 EIF2AK3: PEK/PERK
 EIF2AK4: GCN2

These are all responsible for the phosphorylation of the alpha subunit of eIF-2 at serine 51, one of the best-characterized mechanisms for down-regulating protein synthesis in eukaryotes in response to various cellular stress response's.

References

EC 2.7.11